Compstall is a village in the Metropolitan Borough of Stockport, Greater Manchester, England; it is situated between Marple Bridge and Romiley and is historically part of Cheshire. It was formerly a mill village, built by George Andrew in the 1820s to house his 800 workers. Most of the original mill cottages and other structures remain unchanged.

The waterways were also constructed by Andrew to carry water from the weir, on the River Etherow, to turn the mill wheels, which stood where the car park is today.
A water wheel called "Big Lily" was the largest in England when it was built in 1839. The former millpond forms part of Etherow Country Park, one of the oldest country parks in England.

History
Compstall was first noted as a place where farmers would meet to trade and sell their sheep. The sheep were held at Barlow Fold, Greave Fold, Ratcliffe Fold, Beacom Fold and Lower Fold. In the market place today can be seen the touch stone where deals were made. The touch stone is a glacial erratic deposited during the last ice age. The deal having been agreed, the parties would spit on their hands and hit the stone, sealing the deal.

In 1804, the Andrew family established a water-driven calico printing business downstream from the present mill site. In 1821, Thomas Andrew died. The Manchester Guardian of 22 September recorded "On Friday morning the 14th inst. suddenly of angina pectoris, under which he had laboured for some years, Thomas Andrew, Esq, of Harpurhey aged 68. He has left a widow and numerous family to lament his loss." His son George Andrew I reorganised the business. He built a water-powered cotton mill and a reservoir to power the wheels. He had a steam engine to provide backup power. The earliest workers' cottages had been built in the southern side of the bridge in 1806; in 1823, cottages were built along Market Street on the north side and this became the heart of the village. With further mills, further houses were added to the north of the village and, by 1839, the village was almost complete.

A Co-op store was opened in 1851 and further shops followed. The first church was the Wesleyan Methodist Chapel. The Andrews family built the multipurpose Athenaeum in 1865. St Paul's Church of England church was built in the Early English style.

Steam and gas lighting were installed in the mill by 1890 and these were replaced by electricity in 1915.

Compstall Mills
George Andrew experimented with printing; then, on the death of his father, started on the mill complex on the site we know today. Between 1833 and 1833, he built Old Mill, a five-storey L-shaped building that fronted on the river and on Market Street. At the north end of the building, there was a four-storey building that housed the water wheel. During the six years from 1833 to 1839, the Scotland Mill, the Victoria Mill, Provans Mill and Noah's Ark weaving sheds were built. The first two water wheels, Old Josh and North Wheel, were supplemented by the giant Lily Wheel in 1838.

The North Mill was added between 1839 and 1847 and the mill office was extended. The Albert Mill and a range of riverside buildings, including the mechanics shop were extended between 1847 and 1872. Over the next 25 years, many extra weaving sheds were added and extended. By 1907, a new engine house had been added.

Future developments

After a long period of consultation, planning permission was sought in July 2009 to restore and redevelop the site. The  Victoria and Albert Mills  would be refurbished to create 58 apartments. The Engine House would be restored and house the existing electricity sub-station and provide industrial space. The boiler house, with its traces of the Lily Wheel pit, would be restored and be used as commercial space. The Scotland Mill would be demolished and replaced with the New Scotland Mill with 32 two-bedroom duplex apartments overlooking the Country Park. The building would mirror the length, height and form of the original mill, using complementary materials. New 3- and 4-bedroom terraced family houses would be built along the north bank of the river where the mechanic shop once stood. A new clubhouse for Etherow Country Park Sailing Club would be built on or near the site of the now demolished Noah's Ark shed.

As with any scheme, there would be landscaping, the site would be tidied, parking provided and public open spaces constructed.

Other landmarks
Compstall Hall was built by George Andrew in 1825 in the Grecian Villa style, with an imposing driveway and entrance. It was owned by James Walton during the 1850s.

Compstall Bridge is a Grade II listed building and carries the B6104 road over the River Etherow.

Etherow Country Park

Etherow Country Park was established in 1968, making it one of the oldest country parks in England. It covers 240 acres and includes several millponds and other industrial relics alongside the River Etherow.

Transport

Buses
There are regular bus services on a circular route to and from Stockport town centre: the 383 travels anticlockwise to Romiley, Bredbury and Portwood; and the 384 clockwise to Marple Bridge, Marple and Offerton.

Railway
Compstall does not have its own railway station; the nearest is over a mile away at Marple railway station. It is on the Hope Valley Line between Sheffield, New Mills Central and Manchester Piccadilly. Services are generally half-hourly on Mondays to Saturdays, hourly on Sundays.

See also

 Listed buildings in Bredbury and Romiley

References

Villages in Greater Manchester
Towns and villages of the Peak District
Geography of the Metropolitan Borough of Stockport